Ixora albersii is a species of flowering plant in the family Rubiaceae. It is endemic to the West Usambara Mountains in Tanzania. The epithet albersii commemorates German botanist Eduard Albers.

References

External links
 World Checklist of Rubiaceae

albersii
Flora of Tanzania
Vulnerable plants
Taxonomy articles created by Polbot